Geronimo (full title: Geronimo: The Story of a Great Enemy) is a 1939 American Western film starring Chief Thundercloud as Geronimo, the famous leader of Apache warriors who fought against American colonizers. It was directed by Paul Sloane. This is the first film depiction of Geronimo's life.

Plot
The army's effort to capture Apache chief Geronimo, who is leading a band of warriors on a rampage of raiding and murder, is hampered by a feud between two officers—who are father and son.

Cast
 Chief Thundercloud as Geronimo
 Preston Foster as Captain Bill Starrett
 Ellen Drew as Alice Hamilton
 Andy Devine as Sneezer
 Gene Lockhart as Gillespie
 William Henry as Lt. John Steele Jr.
 Ralph Morgan as Gen. Steele 
 Pierre Watkin as Colonel White
 Marjorie Gateson as Mrs. Steele

Accolades
The film is recognized by American Film Institute in these lists:
 2003: AFI's 100 Years...100 Heroes & Villains:
 Geronimo – Nominated Hero

References

External links

1939 films
1939 Western (genre) films
American Western (genre) films
Apache Wars films
Films about Native Americans
Cultural depictions of Geronimo

Films set in Texas
Universal Pictures films
Films directed by Paul Sloane
American black-and-white films
1930s English-language films
1930s American films